Bolton Percy railway station served the village of Bolton Percy, North Yorkshire, England from 1839 to 1965 on the York and North Midland Railway.

History 
The station opened on 30 May 1839 by the York and North Midland Railway. It closed to both passengers and goods traffic on 13 September 1965.  When open, it consisted of a single long island platform serving just two of the four lines, a similar configuration to that of neighbouring . A large goods shed was also provided to the north of the station.

The platform and buildings were demolished after closure and no trace remains of the station today, save for a gap between the lines where the platform once stood.

References

External links 

Disused railway stations in North Yorkshire
Former York and North Midland Railway stations
Railway stations in Great Britain opened in 1839
Railway stations in Great Britain closed in 1965
1839 establishments in England
1965 disestablishments in England
Beeching closures in England